Lyndsay McLaren Forster (née Clifford; 19 September 1925 – 20 January 2009) was a New Zealand arachnologist.

Biography 
Forster was born in Upper Hutt and grew up on a small farm near Feilding. She enrolled at Victoria University College in Wellington but moved to Christchurch in 1948 without completing her degree. She moved again to Dunedin in 1957; in the late 1960s she returned to her university studies and eventually completed a PhD at the University of Otago in 1979.

Forster was a lecturer in zoology at the University of Otago, and also carried out research and wrote papers and books on spiders. Her work focused on jumping spiders, and on white-tailed spiders and Australian redback spiders. In addition, she worked at the Otago Museum designing and creating displays of spiders, and running educational programmes on spiders for children.

Forster was also an active member of the Otago Institute (the Otago branch of the Royal Society of New Zealand); in 1990 she was elected president, the first woman to hold the position.

Personal life
In 1948 Forster married fellow scientist Ray Forster. The couple had four children together.

Publications

References

1925 births
2009 deaths
New Zealand arachnologists
University of Otago alumni
People from Upper Hutt
Victoria University of Wellington alumni
Academic staff of the University of Otago
20th-century New Zealand women scientists
People associated with Otago Museum
20th-century New Zealand zoologists